The "bullnose" Morris Oxford is a series of motor car models produced by Morris of the United Kingdom, from 1913 to 1926. It was named by W R Morris after the city in which he grew up and which his cars were to industrialise.

Oxford bullnose 1913–16

William Morris's first car was called  Oxford in recognition of its home city. It was announced in The Autocar magazine in October 1912 and production began in March 1913. Because he had a limited amount of capital and was unwilling to share ownership of his business little was made in-house. Virtually all components were bought-in and assembled by Morris. It was a small car with a 1018 cc four-cylinder side-valve engine with fixed cylinder head  from White & Poppe. Ignition was by a Bosch magneto.

The chassis made by Rubery Owen was of pressed-steel construction and suspension was by leaf springs, semi-elliptic at the front and longer three-quarter elliptic at the rear slung above the axle. The welded single piece banjo rear axle with splined half shafts was driven by a Wrigley Worm. The front axle was of forged steel and, like the back axle assembly and the steering, was made by Wrigley. The brakes, on the rear wheels only, were the external contracting type, metal to metal, using four shoes in each drum. A White & Poppe three-forward and reverse gearbox was fitted. The Powell & Hanmer headlamps were acetylene and the side and tail lamps oil. The windscreen, by Auster Limited of Barford Street, Birmingham, like the lamps was classed as an accessory.

The car got its popular name, Bullnose, from its distinctive round-topped radiator at first called the bullet nose. Most bodies, made by Raworth of Oxford, were of the two-seat open-tourer type. There was also a van version, but the chassis did not allow four-seat bodies to be fitted, as it was not strong enough and too short.

Bullnose de luxe
It was first displayed at the Olympia Motor Show which opened 7 November 1913. The standard model remained in production unchanged. The new de luxe had a longer wheelbase,  and track was now .

The range of bodies was now expanded from the simple two-seater to include even a limousine and a sporting car which, like the vans, had no windscreen or doors but was provided with a speedometer as a standard fitting.

Its front axle and steering had been re-designed to reduce "bump-steer"and its radiator capacity increased. Grooved tyres were now supplied at the rear. The banjo back axle was no longer welded but built up from three pieces and its springs were now slung below it.

Trial of the Morris-Oxford Light Car
The suggestion was to have British firms co-operate producing a certain part or parts of the complete mechanism later assembled and sold by a joint undertaking. The Morris-Oxford Light Car, it was explained to readers, was produced on a similar principle. The engine clutch and gearbox were from the works of White & Poppe, the rear axle and the rest of the transmission from Wrigley's.

Of his trial The Timess correspondent reported happy results. Everything was characterised by extreme "up-to-dateness" and the vehicle lacked scarcely any amenity of the largest and most expensive car.

"In general the Morris-Oxford car showed itself to be a speedy and sweet running little car with good hill-climbing powers and an unusual quality of engine flexibility. It is free from any trickiness in handling and is characterised by a general robustness of construction which is very commendable"

Because of this car's significance to Britain's new motor industry the points made by The Times'''s correspondent are summarised below:

 engine: "runs reasonably sweetly at all speeds" despite its small size requiring extremely high r.p.m. to provide full power
 flexibility: as little as 4 m.p.h. could be handled in top direct gear. When the throttle is opened the engine gives better acceleration than might be expected
 speed: the greatest speed on level ground was little short of 50 m.p.h.
 roadholding: it holds the road very comfortably when travelling fast
 frame distortion due to rough roads: is not communicated to the single unit of the engine, multiple-disc clutch mechanism and gearbox
 gearbox: gear changes were easy and quiet at all speeds but the gears themselves were noisy on all but top gear
 clutch: free of chatter or jar it worked easily and sweetly
 worm-driven rear axle: makes the transmission when in top gear "as noiseless as in the largest and most luxurious vehicles"
 brakes: both hand and foot brakes applied directly to the rear wheels. The car pulled up swiftly, completely free of harshness
 accelerator pedal: controls the engine speed. An ingenious device allows the setting of slow running by screwing the head of the pedal on its stem
 comfort: well sprung it leaves little to be desired by driver or passenger when compared to others of its class despite the short wheelbase
 steering: is easy
 body: seats two people comfortably, the makers have "realised the importance of an eyeable and practical neatness"
 windscreen: single folding. Windscreen brackets support the side lamps and anchor the hood straps
 equipment: 2 acetylene head lights, 3 oil lamps (side and tail), horn, pump, jack, tools and a spare detachable wheel.
 wheels: Sankey steel

Cowley
The American engined Continental Cowley, with most other significant components US sourced, shown to the press in April 1915, was a 50 percent larger engined (1495 cc against 1018 cc), longer, wider and better equipped version of this Morris Oxford with the same "Bullnose" radiator.

The Cowley's stronger and larger construction could carry a four-passenger body.

Oxford bullnose 1919–26

The 1919 Oxford (advertised as early as September 1918) was assembled from locally made components and now took on the rather more substantial aspect of 1915's Cowley. Longer and stronger than the old Oxford, enough to carry five passengers, the new Oxford retained the pre-war Bullnose radiator style in its larger version.

From August 1919, the Cowley became the downmarket "no frills" variant with only a 2-seater body and lighter smaller tyres. The Oxford had a self-starter (an extra for the Cowley) and a better electrical system and the Oxford took and kept the Cowley's leather upholstery.

The new car's 11.9 fiscal horsepower 1548 cc engine was made under licence in Coventry for Morris by a British branch of Hotchkiss the French ordnance company which was turning away from guns to the motor industry.  The Hotchkiss engine used the Cowley's Detroit USA Continental Motors Company design. Hotchkiss prices well undercut White and Poppe who had made Oxford engines up to that time. Morris bought Hotchkiss's British factory in May 1923 and named it Morris Engines.

When it was shown at the Scottish Motor Show in January 1920 it drew large crowds of enthusiasts all day. The chassis alone was shown and was genuinely admired for the way all transmission, everything revolving, was fully enclosed in what amounts to an oil bath, everything but the fan belt. A few weeks later after a lengthy trial of the new car The Times motoring reporter wrote that the car represents "a very decided advance in light car construction". The common sense of the designers is shown in many small details but "its greatest charm is in the engine's steam-like flexibility" and liveliness. In these respects it was the best engine the writer had ever encountered.

MG version
The bodies were made by Carbodies Limited of Coventry. At first panelled entirely in aluminium in 1925 and 1926 aluminium was reserved for the lower part of the body and mudguards and scuttle were then steel.

Very high-speed engine
In July 1921 The Times reported on one of "the best makes of British light car of modern design" writing that the 11.9 hp Morris Oxford  could attain a speed of around 45 miles an hour on the level. Indeed, the car ran up Arms Hill, a gradient of about 1 in 4, "without flinching".

14/28
In 1923 the engine was enlarged to 13.9 fiscal  horsepower, 1802 cc. This became known as the 14/28 engine. In 1925 it got a longer wheelbase chassis to move it further from the Cowley, and four-wheel brakes. This model of the Oxford would be the basis of the first MG, the 14/28 Super Sports.

Reviewed by The Times in March 1924 the enlarged engine was reported to be "commendably flexible" and quiet.  It seemed to enjoy being made to turn over at high speed and that happened easily, certainly it had plenty of "courage". The oil filler's lid holds a  dipper rod and forms a breather but there is still no filter at this point. The main strainer can only be withdrawn  after removing a plug in the bottom of the sump. The clutch was good. There is no safety stop for reverse but the gear box was pronounced the chief delight on the car, it is "simple, quiet and expeditious". The accelerator is too sensitive. As before the brake handle was too far away. The car was "easy to travel in". Difficult to avoid on an 8' 6" wheelbase but passengers' coats sweep dusty or muddy wings on entry and exit. The dynamotor (starter-dynamo) sings (gently) at speed. For the price the equipment is very full.

At the next October's Olympia Motor Show the cars were shown with front wheel brakes, to a design by Rubury, as an optional extra at £10. The brake pedal now applied all four-wheel brakes, a separate hand lever controlled brakes at the rear. The list of accessories provided as standard equipment now extended to a 12 months full insurance policy. The reporter advised the driver's entrance appeared somewhat cramped. The claimed brake horsepower was 30.

At the Motor Show 1925 the 14/28 power output was reported to be 34 bhp and four-wheel brakes were standard, the same car had Barker dipping headlamps and thermostatic control of its engine's cooling water.<ref>The Times, Tuesday, Sep 01, 1925; pg. 9; Issue 44055</ref>

The Times tried the 14/28 again and reported to its readers in mid January 1926 that while there may now be better designs of light car the 14/28 represented great value for money and still came with insurance for its first twelve months. A petrol gauge on the dash  and an "automatic screen wiper", two horns and a proper rear windscreen. There was still no filter in the oil filler. The same complaints were made as in previous reports yet the car's general behaviour on the road was considered "praiseworthy".

Production numbers

References

Bibliography

External links

Oxford bullnose
First car made by manufacturer
Cars introduced in 1913
Vehicles introduced in 1913
1920s cars